Hatchet Lake is an alpine lake in Custer County, Idaho, United States, located in the White Cloud Mountains in the Sawtooth National Recreation Area.  The lake is named for its distinct hatchet shape as seen from above.

Hatchet Lake is northeast of Merriam Peak and located in the lower section of the Boulder Chain Lakes Basin.  The lake is accessed from Sawtooth National Forest trail 683.

References

See also
List of lakes of the White Cloud Mountains
Sawtooth National Recreation Area
Shelf Lake
White Cloud Mountains

Lakes of Idaho
Lakes of Custer County, Idaho
Glacial lakes of the United States
Glacial lakes of the Sawtooth National Forest